KVIS (910 AM) is a radio station broadcasting a Southern Gospel format.  Licensed to Miami, Oklahoma, United States, the station serves the Joplin, Missouri, area.  The station is currently owned by Mark Linn, through licensee Taylor Made Broadcasting Network, LLC, and features programming from Salem Communications.

History
KVIS was previously a Pop music station, formerly airing the American Top 40 radio broadcast with Casey Kasem during the 1970s.

References

External links
http://www.okradiostation.com/kvis-910-am/

Southern Gospel radio stations in the United States
VIS
VIS
Miami, Oklahoma